The 2010 Tunis Open was a professional tennis tournament played on red clay courts. It was part of the Tretorn SERIE+ of the 2010 ATP Challenger Tour. It took place in Tunis, Tunisia between April 26 and May 2, 2010.

ATP entrants

Seeds

 Rankings are as of April 19, 2010.

Other entrants
The following players received wildcards into the singles main draw:
  Reda El Amrani
  Malek Jaziri
  Nicolas Kiefer
  Mehdi Ziadi

The following players received entry from the qualifying draw:
  Iñigo Cervantes-Huegun
  Boris Pašanski
  João Sousa
  Peter Torebko

Champions

Singles

 José Acasuso def.  Daniel Brands, 6–3, 6–4

Doubles

 Jeff Coetzee /  Kristof Vliegen def.  James Cerretani /  Adil Shamasdin, 7–6(3), 6–3

External links
Official website
ITF search

Tunis Open
Tennis tournaments in Tunisia
Tunis Open